Riverside, Idaho may refer to:
Riverside, Bingham County, Idaho, a census-designated place in Bingham County
Riverside, Bonner County, Idaho, a former settlement in Bonner County
Riverside, Canyon County, Idaho, an unincorporated community in Canyon County
Riverside, Clearwater County, Idaho, an unincorporated community in Clearwater County